Min Byung-hun (born March 10, 1987) is a South Korean professional baseball right fielder who has played for the Doosan Bears of the Korea Baseball Organization for eleven seasons. In November 2017, he signed a four-year KRW 8 billion contract with the Lotte Giants.

References

External links
Career statistics and player information from Korea Baseball Organization
Min Byung-hun at doosanbears.com 
Min byung-hun Bench-clearing brawl sbs 

1987 births
Living people
Baseball players from Seoul
Doosan Bears players
Lotte Giants players
KBO League outfielders
South Korean baseball players
Asian Games medalists in baseball
Baseball players at the 2014 Asian Games
2015 WBSC Premier12 players
2017 World Baseball Classic players
Medalists at the 2014 Asian Games
Asian Games gold medalists for South Korea
Yeoheung Min clan